The Gujarat cricket team is one of three first-class cricket teams representing the state of Gujarat (the other two being the Baroda cricket team and Saurashtra cricket team).

Led by Parthiv Patel, Gujarat won their maiden Ranji Trophy title in the 2016–17 season, beating Mumbai in the final at Indore. In that match they made the highest successful run-chase in the final of the Ranji Trophy.

It is in the Elite Group of the Ranji Trophy although it has had very little success. There have, however, been many cricketers that have passed through its ranks and gone on to play for the Indian cricket team. It falls under the West Zone in the Duleep Trophy.

History 
Gujarat's first appearance in a Ranji Trophy final came in the season of 1950–51, where it was facing Holkar in the Ranji Trophy Final. Holkar won the high-scoring match by 189 runs, the match featured a double century by Holkar's Chandu Sarwate and a fighting 152 by Gujarati off-spinner Jasu Patel (who averaged 21.70 in 87 innings).

In 2007–08, Gujarat won their maiden Ranji Trophy Plate League title by defeating Railways. Gujarat were in a lose-win situation and six and four and out they lost.

In the year 2010/11, Gujarat made a wonderful start to the Ranji Season. They went for a draw against Bengal and later on made an outright win against a strong Delhi Team but lost two consecutive matches against Madhya Pradesh and Baroda which ended their hope of entering Quarter Final Stage.
 
They drew a high scoring match against Tamil Nadu, which featured the comeback of Parthiv Patel (as he was busy in national duty) but lost the match against Haryana which forced them to go back at the Plate League.

Gujarat won the Syed Mushtaq Ali trophy in 2012–13 defeating Punjab in the final by four wickets with 13 deliveries to spare.

Gujarat's best appearance in a Ranji Trophy final came in the season of 2016–17, where it was facing Mumbai in the Ranji Trophy final in Indore. Parthiv Patel scored a precious century (143, 196b, 24 x 4s) and scripted a most memorable maiden Ranji Trophy victory at the Holkar Stadium. No team had chased a target over 310 in the Ranji Trophy and when Gujarat began the fifth and final day. Priyank Panchal from Gujarat made 1310 runs in the 2016-17 Ranji Trophy season at an average of 87.33 from 17 innings, which is the most by any batsman this season and the third most by any batsman in a single Ranji Trophy season.  Gujarat’s Samit Gohel made 359* runs against Orissa in Jaipur in this Ranji Trophy season, which became the joint fourth most by a player in a Ranji Trophy match. His score of 359* in that match is now the highest by an opener carrying the bat in a First Class match. He faced 723 balls in that innings and it is now the sixth-longest innings in terms of balls faced in a First Class match.

Honours
 Ranji Trophy
 Winners (1): 2016–17

Home grounds 

 Narendra Modi Stadium, Ahmedabad
 Lalabhai Contractor Stadium, Surat
 Sardar Vallabhbhai Patel Stadium, Valsad

Notable players 

 Vinoo Mankad
 Nari Contractor
 Axar Patel
 Parthiv Patel
 Manpreet Juneja
 Jasu Patel
 Deepak Shodhan
 Jasprit Bumrah
  Piyush Chawla

Current squad 
Players with international caps are listed in bold.

Updated as on 24 January 2023

References

External links
 Gujarat cricket team official website
 Gujarat Cricket Team page at Cricinfo

Indian first-class cricket teams
Cricket in Gujarat
1935 establishments in India
Cricket clubs established in 1935